Egor Sharov (born 16 December 1988) is a Paralympian athlete from Russia competing mainly in category T13 middle-distance events.

References

External links
 

Paralympic athletes of Russia
Athletes (track and field) at the 2012 Summer Paralympics
Paralympic silver medalists for Russia
1988 births
Living people
World record holders in Paralympic athletics
Russian male middle-distance runners
Medalists at the 2012 Summer Paralympics
Medalists at the World Para Athletics Championships
World Para Athletics Championships winners
Medalists at the World Para Athletics European Championships
Paralympic medalists in athletics (track and field)
Athletes (track and field) at the 2020 Summer Paralympics
Sportspeople from Barnaul
Visually impaired middle-distance runners
Paralympic middle-distance runners
21st-century Russian people